Robert Eugene Glennen Jr. (March 31, 1933 – December 1, 2015) was an American education administrator, most recently serving as Emporia State University's thirteenth president in Emporia, Kansas. Before president of Emporia State, Glennen also served as the tenth president at Western New Mexico University, various administrative jobs at the University of Nevada, Las Vegas and the University of Notre Dame.

Education
Glennen received his bachelor of arts and master's degree from the University of Portland, and his doctorate from the University of Notre Dame in 1962.

Career

1960s and 70s
After graduating from Notre Dame in 1962, Glennen was the associate dean at Notre Dame for 10 years. After that, he became the UNLV vice-president and dean of the university's college. At both Notre Dame and UNLV, Glennen's job was to create new programs for undecided freshman students.

Presidencies
In 1980 after being at UNLV for eight years, Glennen moved to Silver City, New Mexico to become the tenth president of Western New Mexico University. He served as the president from 1980 to 1984. In 1984, Glennen became Emporia State University's next president.

Emporia State University
When Glennen arrived at Emporia State in July 1984, many issues were happening involving budget cuts, an enrollment decline, and even the possibility of closing the institution. One of his most successful events during his administration was the establishment of the National Teachers Hall of Fame, a non-profit organization that honors exceptional school teachers throughout the United States. On July 31, 1997, he retired as president and took a year off before returning as a faculty member in The Teachers College in the division of counselor education and rehabilitation programs in 1998 for one year. He officially retired from teaching after the 1998–99 school year.

References

Presidents of Emporia State University
Western New Mexico University faculty
University of Nevada, Las Vegas faculty
University of Notre Dame faculty
University of Notre Dame alumni
People from Omaha, Nebraska
1933 births
2015 deaths
People from Silver City, New Mexico